John Justin & the Thunderwings were an Australian rock band formed by John Justin (guitar, vocals), Paul Hines (keyboards), Gordon Pitt (bass, vocals), Carl Manuel (drums) in 1985. In 1987, Tony Featherstone (bass) replaced Pitt and Robert Wodrow (drums) replaced Manuel. They released one full length album, Justice, in 1986.

Debbie Cameron of The Canberra Times described the impact of the album, "I am not wildly enthusiastic about this type of music so I do not want to be unduly unfriendly about it. All I will say is that Justin appears to be a competent exponent." Australian musicologist, Ian McFarlane, felt "[it] was brimming with swaggering glam-pop material."

Their debut single "Flash King Cadillac" (1986) was co-produced by Ross Fraser. Fraser was nominated for Producer of the Year at the ARIA Music Awards of 1987 for his work on this single and an album, Whispering Jack, by John Farnham.

Discography

Studio albums

Singles

References

Australian rock music groups
Musical groups established in 1985
Musical groups disestablished in 1987
1985 establishments in Australia